Jawaharlal Nehru Stadium is a multi purpose stadium in  Hubli, Karnataka. The ground is mainly used for organizing matches of football, cricket and other sports. The stadium has hosted three Ranji Trophy match  in 1972 when Mysore cricket team played against Kerala cricket team. The ground has two more Ranji Trophy matches in 1976 and against in 1992, but since then the stadium has hosted non-first-class matches.

References

External links 

 cricketarchive
 cricinfo
 Wikimapia

Buildings and structures in Hubli-Dharwad
Cricket grounds in Karnataka
Defunct cricket grounds in India
Sports venues completed in 1958
1958 establishments in Mysore State
20th-century architecture in India